Mahjouba may refer to the following places in North Africa:
 Mahjouba, Morocco
 Mahjouba, Tunisia